The 2003 FIS Ski Jumping Grand Prix was the 10th Summer Grand Prix season in ski jumping on plastic. Season began on 9 August 2003 in Hinterzarten, Germany and ended on 31 August 2003 in Innsbruck, Austria.

Calendar

Men

Men's team

Standings

Overall

After 4 events.

Nations Cup

After 5 events.

See also
 2003–04 World Cup

References

Grand Prix
FIS Grand Prix Ski Jumping